Table tennis at the 2010 South American Games in Medellín was held from March 21 to March 26. All games were played at Coliseo Menor Rodrigo Pérez Castro.

Medal summary

Medal table

Medalists

References

2010 South American Games
South American Games
South American Games
2010